Radmila Vasileva (born 5 January 1964) is a Bulgarian basketball player. She competed in the women's tournament at the 1988 Summer Olympics.

References

1964 births
Living people
Bulgarian women's basketball players
Olympic basketball players of Bulgaria
Basketball players at the 1988 Summer Olympics
Basketball players from Sofia